Tolmin may refer to:

 TOLMIN, an optimization software that minimizes a general differentiable nonlinear function subject to linear constraints, written by Michael J. D. Powell.
 Tolmin, a town in northwestern Slovenia.
 The Municipality of Tolmin in northwestern Slovenia.